The 1908 Colorado Silver and Gold football team was an American football team that represented the University of Colorado as a member of the Colorado Football Association (CFA) during the 1908 college football season. Fred Folsom, who had left Colorado to coach at Dartmouth  College from 1903 to 1907, returned as the team's head coach for his third stint and eighth overall season. Under Folsom's guidance, the team compiled an overall record of 5–2 record with a mark of 3–1 in conference playing, placing second in the CFA. Colorado outscored its opponents by a total of 96 to 35.

Schedule

References

Colorado
Colorado Buffaloes football seasons
Colorado Silver and Gold football